The 1986–87 SK Rapid Wien season was the 89th season in club history.

Squad

Squad and statistics

Squad statistics

Fixtures and results

League

Cup

Supercup

Cup Winners' Cup

References

1986-87 Rapid Wien Season
Rapid
Austrian football championship-winning seasons